Alice Owens may refer to:

Dame Alice Owen's School
Alice Owens, character in About Adam